Issam Chernoubi (born 17 December 1987 in Salé) is a Moroccan taekwondo practitioner. He competed in the 80 kg event at the 2012 Summer Olympics and was eliminated in the preliminary round by Nesar Ahmad Bahave.

References

1987 births
Living people
Moroccan male taekwondo practitioners
Olympic taekwondo practitioners of Morocco
Taekwondo practitioners at the 2012 Summer Olympics
Mediterranean Games gold medalists for Morocco
Competitors at the 2013 Mediterranean Games
Universiade medalists in taekwondo
Mediterranean Games medalists in taekwondo
Universiade bronze medalists for Morocco
Medalists at the 2011 Summer Universiade
20th-century Moroccan people
21st-century Moroccan people